The Archdiocese of Sassari is a Roman Catholic ecclesiastical territory in Sardinia, Italy. Its see was initially at Torres. It was elevated to an archdiocese in 1073.

Its suffragan sees are the diocese of Alghero-Bosa, the diocese of Ozieri and the diocese of Tempio-Ampurias.

History

The ecclesiastical history of Torres (Turris Lybissonis) goes back to the fourth century. In 304 the soldier Gavinus, Protus a priest, and the deacon Januarius suffered martyrdom there. Later Gavinus and Protus were reputed bishops, and said to have lived in the second and third centuries respectively. St. Gaudentius, who seems to have belonged to the beginning of the fourth century, is also venerated there.

The first bishop whose date is known is Felix (404). Other bishops include Marinianus, a contemporary of Gregory the Great; Novellus (685), whose ordination caused a controversy between Pope John V and the Archbishop of Cagliari; and Felix (727), who took refuge at Genoa from the Saracens.

Almost nothing is known concerning bishops of Torres for the next three centuries, till Simon (1065). His successor, Costantino de Crasta (1073), was an archbishop. Other archbishops: Blasius (1199), representative of Innocent III, on several occasions; Stefano, O.P. (1238), legate of Innocent IV in Sardinia and Corsica; Trogodario (about 1278) who erected the episcopal palace in Sassari, to which Teodosio (1292) added the Church of St. Andrea; after this the archbishops resided habitually at Sassari.

Pietro Spano (1422) was a restorer of discipline; under him the episcopal see was definitively transferred to Sassari by Pope Eugenius IV. This bishop intended to erect a seminary for the training of the clergy, but his death frustrated the plan. Angelo Leonini (1509) was at the Fifth Lateran Council; Salvatore Salepusi (1553) was distinguished at the Council of Trent; Alfonso de Sorca (1585), was highly esteemed by Clement VIII.

At about the year 1500 there were united to the Archdiocese of Sassari, the Diocese of Sorres (Sorrensis) which is mentioned as a bishopric in 1106, and whose last bishop was Jacopo Poggi; and the diocese of Ploaghe (Plubium), the first known bishop of which is Jacentius (1090).

See also
Nostra Signora di Tergu

Notes

External links
Source

Roman Catholic dioceses in Sardinia
Dioceses established in the 5th century